Magabala Books is an Indigenous publishing house based in Broome, Western Australia.

It started in the late 1980s and early 1990s.

The name Magabala is a Yawuru, Karrajari and Nyulnyul word for the bush banana. In 1990, Magabala Books became an independent Aboriginal corporation. Magabala's stated objective is "restoring, preserving and maintaining Aboriginal and Torres Strait Islander cultures".

Many prominent Australian Indigenous authors have been published with Magabala Books, including Anita Heiss, Ali Cobby Eckermann, Jimmy Pike, Alexis Wright, Bronwyn Bancroft, Jack Davis, Bill Neidjie, Stephen Hagan, Jack Davis, Jimmy Chi and Bruce Pascoe.

The literature ranges from Aboriginal lore, children's books, various picture books, as well as oral history of indigenous culture.

Magabala Books won the small publisher of the year award at the 2020 Australian Book Industry Awards.

Magabala Fellowship 
In August 2020 it launched a fellowship, valued at A$10,000, for First Nations writers who have had at least one book published.

Winners 

 Tristan Michael Savage – 2021

See also

References

External links 

 

Broome, Western Australia
Book publishing companies of Australia
Indigenous Australian mass media